The Farmer Takes a Wife is a 1953 Technicolor musical comedy film starring Betty Grable and Dale Robertson. The picture is a remake of the 1935 film of the same name which starred Janet Gaynor and Henry Fonda. Grable and Dale Robertson first appeared together in the movie Call Me Mister (1951).

Plot
During the 19th century, where Molly Larkins (Betty Grable), the girlfriend of rough-and-tumble canal-boat captain Jotham Klore (John Carroll) she hires mild-mannered farmer Daniel Harrow (Dale Robertson) to work on the boat. Molly and Dan fall in love and marry.

Cast
 Betty Grable as Molly Larkins
 Dale Robertson as Dan Harrow
 Thelma Ritter as Lucy Cashdollar
 John Carroll as Jotham Klore
 Eddie Foy, Jr. as Fortune Friendly
 Charlotte Austin as Pearl Dowd
 Kathleen Crowley as Susanna
 Merry Anders as Hannah
 May Wynn as Eva Gooch
 George 'Gabby' Hayes as Uncle Ben
 Nancy Abbate as Little Girl (uncredited)
 Doreen Tracey as Little Girl (uncredited)

Songs
Harold Arlen & Dorothy Fields composed the following songs for the movie:
"Can You Spell Schenectady?"
"The Erie Canal"
"I Could Cook"
"I Was Wearin' Horse Shoes"
"Look Who's Been Dreaming"
"On The Erie Canal"
"Somethin' Real Special"
"Today I Love Everybody"
"We're Doin' It For The Natives In Jamaica"
"We're In Business"
"When I Close My Door"
"With The Sun Warm Upon Me"
"Yes!"

Radio adaptation
The Farmer Takes a Wife was presented on Best Plays June 28, 1953. The one-hour adaptation starred John Forsythe and Joan Lorring.

References

External links
 
 
 
 

1953 films
1953 musical comedy films
1953 romantic comedy films
1950s historical comedy films
American historical comedy films
American musical comedy films
American romantic comedy films
American romantic musical films
Films based on American novels
American films based on plays
Films based on romance novels
Films set in the 19th century
Films set in New York (state)
20th Century Fox films
Films directed by Henry Levin
Films based on adaptations
Films scored by Cyril J. Mockridge
American historical romance films
1950s historical romance films
American historical musical films
1950s English-language films
1950s American films